Tranent/Wallyford/Macmerry is one of the six wards used to elect members of the East Lothian Council. It elects three Councillors.

Councillors

Election Results

2017 Election
2017 East Lothian Council election

References

Wards of East Lothian
Tranent